The 1955 Gran Premio del Valentino was a non-championship Formula One motor race held on 27 March 1955 at the Parco del Valentino in Turin. The Grand Prix was won by Alberto Ascari driving a Lancia D50; Ascari also set pole position. Roberto Mieres in a Maserati 250F finished second and Luigi Villoresi in a Lancia D50 was third. Maserati driver Jean Behra set fastest lap.

This was the last motor race to be held at the Parco del Valentino.

Classification

Race

References

Valentino
1955 in Italian motorsport